The 2015 USAFL National Championships was the 19th instalment of the premier United States annual Australian rules football club tournament. The tournament was held in Austin, Texas, for the third time, from 17 October to 18 October. It was the first edition of the tournament with two women's divisions. The Austin Crows won the Division 1 Men's Title defeating the Orange County Bombers. The Denver Bulldogs won the Division 1 Women's Title finishing first in a four-game round robin.

Clubs

Men's

Women's

Men's Division 1

Round 1 (Men's Division 1)

Round 2 (Men's Division 1)

Round 3 (Men's Division 1)

Group Stage Ladders (Men's Division 1)

Group A

Group B

Grand Final (Men's Division 1)

Women's Division 1

Round 1 (Women's Division 1)

Ladder (Women's Division 1)

2015 USAFL National Championships club rankings

Men

Women

References

External links

USAFL season
Australian rules football competitions
National championships in the United States
Sports competitions in Texas
Sports in Austin, Texas
2015 in sports in Texas